The Hyundai Prophecy is a concept electric car  produced by the South Korean manufacturer Hyundai presented in March 2020, and announced in a family sedan range in 2021 replacing the Hyundai Ioniq. The Hyundai Prophecy EV is going into production together with the Hyundai Ioniq 5 with the mission to form part of the company’s 23 electric vehicles (EV) portfolio by 2025.

Presentation 
The Hyundai Prophecy concept car was to be presented at the Geneva Motor Show in 2020 but it was canceled due to the COVID-19 pandemic in Switzerland. It was presented on the web on 3 March 2020. The production version is called the Ioniq 6, under Hyundai's Ioniq sub brand, and has entered the market in 2022.

Technical characteristics 
The Prophecy is based on a new modular technical platform called "e-GMP" dedicated to the brand's future electric vehicles. It is equipped with rear doors with antagonistic openings. Inside, the concept has an air purifier and there is no steering wheel, this is replaced by two joysticks arranged on each side of the driver.

References

Prophecy
Electric concept cars